Antoine "Anthony" "Andy" Sauter (May 4, 1848 – April 16, 1905) was a machinist, once foreman of various shops in the Roanoke Machine Works for the Norfolk and Western Railroad. He was a general foreman for the shops at Lambert's Point from 1895 to 1903.

Early years
Sauter was born on May 4, 1848, to Henri Sauter and Marie Anne Sick (or Sieg) in Oberhergheim in Alsace, France. He attended the public and private schools, and worked for the Koechlin machine shops from 1863 to 1867.

On April 21, 1870, he married Catherine Senn in Mulhouse. Sauter was working as a locksmith.

United States
Following the Franco-Prussian War, the Sauters left for America, arriving in Jersey City on April 1, 1872. He worked in Jersey City for the Erie Railways Company until its shops were consumed by fire on July 24, and then he moved to Susquehanna, Pennsylvania to work for the same company.

He arrived in Roanoke on July 4, 1882, staying for 13 years the foreman of its machine shops under Frederick J. Kimball. Sauter received a promotion to "master mechanic" and moved to Lambert's Point near Norfolk. He was serenaded at his home by the Roanoke Machine Works Band shortly before the move, on December 1, 1895.

Sauter spent a short time with his son as foreman in Portsmouth, Ohio before he was taken ill. He died of endocarditis in Philadelphia, Pennsylvania at the German Hospital on April 16, 1905.

Notes

References

External links

1848 births
1905 deaths
People from Mulhouse
People from Roanoke, Virginia
People from Norfolk, Virginia
People from Susquehanna County, Pennsylvania
Machinists
French emigrants to the United States
Alsatian people
Deaths from endocarditis
Norfolk and Western Railway
Locksmiths